Liptena albomacula is a butterfly in the family Lycaenidae. It is found in the Democratic Republic of the Congo (Sankuru and Lualaba), Uganda and Cameroon.

References

Butterflies described in 1933
Liptena